The Flight of the Grey Wolf was a 1976 television film produced by Walt Disney Productions, and broadcast in two parts on The Wonderful World of Disney, the first part airing on May 14, 1976. The film was directed by Frank Zuniga, and stars Jeff East, Bill Williams, Barbara Hale, and William Bryant.

In July 1975 Disney announced that the film would be part of its 1975-1976 line-up on The Wonderful World of Disney.  It was to be one of two longer films which were to be broken down into two parts and be shown on back-to-back Sundays, the other being The Boy Who Talked to Badgers. The first part of the film aired on Sunday, March 14, 1976, opposite The Wizard of Oz, which was airing on CBS.  The second part aired the following Sunday, March 21.

Plot
As Russ is attacked by a dog, his pet wolf, Grey comes to his defense and kills the dog. Frightened, Grey runs away, and in the process frightens a rancher's daughter. When the town is roused to take action against Grey, Russ takes the wolf into the forest and realizes that he will never be able to bring Grey back to his former home, but he also understands he cannot simply release the wolf into the wild, so he starts trying to re-establishing the wolf's natural instincts.

Cast
Jeff East as Russ Hanson
Bill Williams as The Sheriff
Barbara Hale as Mrs. Hanson
William Bryant as Mr. Hanson
Eric Server as the Deputy
Judson Pratt as Mr. Pomeroy
Sam Edwards as Amsel
Owen Bush as Tom
Joe Haworth as Josh
Jesse Martin as Hunter

References

External links
 

1976 films
Films produced by Roy E. Disney
Films about wolves